The 2016 Porsche Carrera Cup Italia season was the tenth Porsche Carrera Cup Italy season. It began on 30 April at Monza and finished on 16 October in Mugello, after seven events with three races at each event.

Teams and drivers

Race calendar and results
Starting from 2016, each round includes three races: two sprints on Saturday and an endurance on Sunday. Each one of the sprint races' starting grid is defined by a qualifying session; for the endurance race, the starting grid is determined by the summation of the best laps of each qualifying session.

Championship standings

Drivers' Championship
Only the best Sprint Race for each weekend counts towards the championship.

† - Drivers did not finish the race, but were classified as they completed over 90% of the race distance.

Teams' Championship

† - Drivers did not finish the race, but were classified as they completed over 90% of the race distance.

Michelin Cup
The Michelin Cup is the trophy reserved to the gentlemen drivers.

Porsche Carrera Cup Italia Scholarship Programme
The Scholarship Programme Cup is the trophy reserved to the under-26 drivers elected by Porsche at the beginning of the season.

References

External links
 

Porsche Carrera Cup Italy seasons
Porsche Carrera Cup Italy